The National Landmark of Soaring program acknowledges people, places and events significant in the history of gliders and motorless aviation in the United States.
It is administered by the National Soaring Museum.  The program was established in 1980.

The title of National Landmark of Soaring has been granted 16 times.

References 

Gliding in the United States
1980 establishments in the United States
Awards established in 1980